Olavi Allan Nikkilä (12 April 1922, Sääksmäki - 15 June 2014) was a Finnish agronomist, farmer and politician. He was a member of the Parliament of Finland from 1966 to 1975 and again from 1979 to 1983, representing the National Coalition Party.

References

1922 births
2014 deaths
People from Valkeakoski
National Coalition Party politicians
Members of the Parliament of Finland (1966–70)
Members of the Parliament of Finland (1970–72)
Members of the Parliament of Finland (1972–75)
Members of the Parliament of Finland (1979–83)